New Site is a village in South Sudan near the border with Kenya. It is used by the SPLA/M as the location for their headquarters and was selected because it is near the border and has quite a good number of trees to protect them from aerial bombardments.

There is also a community of several hundred Ik language speakers in New Site.

References

Populated places in Eastern Equatoria